Biwanr is a town in Hamirpur District of Uttar Pradesh, India.

Geography 
Biwanr is located approx 400 km from Delhi, the national capital.

Demographic view 
 India census, Biwanr had a population of 10386. Males constituted 5643 of the population and females 4743. Bewar has an average literacy rate of 64.3%.

Education
Bal Bharati Higher Secondary School Bewar Mainpuri

References

Biwanr Census

Cities and towns in Hamirpur district, Uttar Pradesh